Namburi Paripurna is a Telugu writer who has published short stories, novels and essays over the past 50 years. Her Telugu autobiography "velugu daarulalo". was published in 2017.

Life
Namburi Paripurna was born in Bommuluru village of Krishna District in Andhra Pradesh, India to Namburi Lakshmayya and Namburi Lakshmamma, on 1 July 1931. Her primary education happened in Krishna District, and high school education in Rajamundry and Madras. After studying further briefly in P.R.College, Kakinada, she was trained to be a teacher and earn a B.A. degree through distance education.

She was married to a Communist leader Dasari Nagabhushana Rao and has three children: Sireesha, Amarendra and Shailendra, of which the first two are also Telugu writers of repute. She started her professional life as a teacher in 1955 and later worked for three decades as a state government employee, before retiring in 1989.

Social Life
Paripurna was a student activist with the communist party of India during 1944-49, and experienced confinement and underground life as a Communist activist during 1950-52. As a social worker, she has actively participated in "Alambana", a non-profit organization, for over twenty years.

Paripurna was an actor in the past and actively performed in Telugu dramas as a child. She acted as Prahlada in the 1942 Telugu movie Bhakta Prahlada, directed by Chitrapu Narayana Murthy. She also played a role in a Telugu tele-film "Iddaru Okkate" directed by Akkineni Kutumba Rao in 1986. A collection of her Telugu songs appeared as an album "Swara Purnima", under the music direction of Sarraju Prasanna Kumar in 2004.

Writings
 Maaku raavu suryodayalu (We will not have sunrises), novella, 1985.
 Untayi maku ushassulu (We will see the dawn), short stories, 1998. 
 Katha Paripurnam, short stories (jointly with her children), 2006. 
 Sikhararohana (Climbing the summit), essays and short stories, 2016. 
 Velugu Daarulalo (In the path of light), Autobiography, 2017.  
 Polimera (The Boundary), Novel, 2018.

A short story by Namburi Paripurna "Tirigi Pravasaniki" was translated into English as "Returning Home"

References

Telugu writers
1931 births
Telugu women writers
Living people
20th-century Indian women writers